The Permanent Under-Secretary of State of the Home Office is the permanent secretary of the Home Office, the most senior civil servant in the department, charged with running its affairs on a day-to-day basis.

Home Office Permanent Secretaries

 March 1782: J. Bell
 December 1791: John King
 February 1806 – 1817: John Beckett [later Sir John Beckett, Bart.] 
 June 1817 – 1827: Henry Hobhouse
 July 1827 – 1848: Samuel March Phillipps
 1848–1867: Horatio Waddington
 1867–1885: (Sir) Adolphus Frederick Octavius Liddell
 June 1885: Sir H. Maine
 July 1885 – 1895: Sir Godfrey Lushington
 1895–1903: Sir Kenelm Digby
 1903–1908: Sir Mackenzie Dalzell Chalmers
 1908–1922: Sir Edward Troup
 1922–1932: Sir John Anderson
 1932–1938: Sir Russell Scott
 1938–1948: Sir Alexander Maxwell
 1948–1957: Sir Frank Newsam
 1957–1966: Sir Charles Cunningham
 1966–1972: Sir Philip Allen
 1972–1977: Sir Arthur Peterson
 1977–1979: Sir Robert Armstrong
 1979–1988: Sir Brian Cubbon
 1988–1994: Sir Clive Whitmore
 1994–1997: Sir Richard Wilson
 1997–2001: Sir David Omand
 2001–2005: Sir John Gieve
 2005–2011: Sir David Normington
 2011–2012: Dame Helen Ghosh
 2012–2013: Helen Kilpatrick (acting)
 2013–2017: Mark Sedwill
 2017–2020: Sir Philip Rutnam
 17 March 2020: Sir Matthew Rycroft

See also 

Permanent Under-Secretary of State for Foreign Affairs
Under-Secretary of State for the Home Department
Undersecretary

References 

Permanent Under-Secretaries of State for the Home Department
Government of the United Kingdom
British civil servants
Lists of British civil servants